Choy Weng Yang is a Singaporean artist, curator and arts writer and a proponent of the art fraternity in post-independent Singapore. His literary contributions on post-modern arts in Singapore, had helped shaped the contemporary art scene in Singapore.

Born 12 July 1930 in Singapore, Choy graduated with a National Diploma of Art UK from Hornsey College of Art in 1962 and received the Art Teachers' Certificate (UK) from the University of London Institute of Education in 1963. In his years as a student in London, he had many opportunities to study the works of great modern artists like Picasso and Mondrian, through visits to other European cities. These opportunities to travel, shaped his knowledge of art and his aesthetic development for his art in the years to come.

Back in Singapore after graduating from the Institute Choy worked as assistant lecturer in the Arts & Crafts Department of the Teachers' Training College, and subsequently took office as a Curator of Art with the National Museum of Singapore in 1978. In his professional capacity he has served actively for the arts circle, receiving acclamation for his art criticisms for artists and writings about local artistic movements. Choy's passion for painting never left him despite his heavy work commitments, and actively participated in group artshows in Australia and Paris. In 1982, Choy had contributed to an article on Singapore art, and published in the very first Singapore art directory, titled "Singaporean artists". This book was officially launched at the 1982 National Day Art Exhibition, by the then Minister of State for Culture, Major Fong Sip Chee, on 16 Aug 1982.

His exposures to the western art during his curatorship tenure, enabled him to develop his artistic side. In the early years he was particularly influenced by the works by Monet, for its light and colour in his paintings. Progressively he found that using light and colour alone on his canvas was not enough in his own compositions. Cézanne's use of structure in his composition, and Mondrian's strength in order, clarity and strong composition design thus became an important elements in Choy's paintings from 1985 on. It is also in the same year that Choy decided to retire from his curatorial position to devote himself as a full-time painter. In the 1990s, Choy's works are increasingly influenced by Chinese ink and wash paintings by the great Chinese masters of bygone dynasties.

In the years that followed after his retirement, Choy continued to be active in the arts scene. Choy's curatorial experience continued to be sought after by many art aficionados and artists alike, and frequently pens art criticisms and introductions of artists for their exhibitions and art publications.

Major Exhibitions

References

Singaporean people of Cantonese descent
Singaporean art curators
Singaporean artists
Singaporean painters
1930 births
Living people
Alumni of the UCL Institute of Education